Edward Percival Bottley (10 January 1904 – 8 February 1980) was an English geologist and businessman.

With his wife, Winifred, Bottley founded a geological dealership in Derby, England around 1928 which dealt largely in microscope slides. Bottley made 113 illustrations  in colour and black and white.

In the 1930s, the couple took over Gregory's..  They expanded the firm to supply museums, universities and private collectors.

Bottley died in 1980. Winifred carried on the business after his death.

References

1904 births
1980 deaths
20th-century British geologists
20th-century English businesspeople